The 98th Pennsylvania Infantry  was a volunteer infantry regiment which served during the American Civil War. Colonel John Ballier, who founded the unit to replace his 21st Regiment, served as commanding officer.

The majority of the men who fought with the regiment were of German heritage; many came from the Philadelphia area. One, August Frank of Company E, was reportedly descended from the family of George Washington (through his brother Augustine).

Service history
Perhaps most famous for its service at Salem Heights, Virginia, the 98th Pennsylvania had its initial combat experience in the Battle of Williamsburg. In addition, the regiment fought at Antietam, Fredericksburg, Gettysburg, and Appomattox, among other engagements, and was also present at the surrender of General Robert E. Lee.

Casualties
The regiment sustained a significant number of casualties during its service tenure, including during the Battle of Fort Stevens on July 12, 1864. Ballier, in fact, was one of those wounded during the engagement, a military encounter in which President Abraham Lincoln was also nearly injured by Confederate fire while standing on a parapet surveying the action. After having sustained a gunshot wound to his right ankle on May 3, he then also sustained a gunshot wound to his right thigh at Fort Stevens.

Monuments and Memorials
Monuments:
The accomplishments and sacrifices of the 98th Pennsylvania have been memorialized via two monuments at the Gettysburg Battlefield Historic District.
There is also a monument to the 98th PA at Rock Creek Park in Washington DC, to honor those who fought at the Battle of Fort Stevens.

Memorials:
The website www.98thPVI.com is a website created to compile the history of the regiment as well as to memorialize the individual soldiers.

References

Units and formations of the Union Army from Pennsylvania
Military units and formations established in 1861
Military units and formations disestablished in 1865